Songs of Innocence is an illustrated collection of poems by William Blake, the first book of two in Songs of Innocence and Experience.

Songs of Innocence may also refer to:

Songs of Innocence: The Story of British Childhood, a book by Fran Abrams

Music
 Song of Innocence, a 1968 album and its title track by David Axelrod
 "Song of Innocence", a song by Terry Scott Taylor from album Knowledge & Innocence, 1986 
 Songs of Innocence, album by Norman Curtis with Peggy Smith, 1953
 Songs of Innocence, a classical recital album by Andrew Swait (treble), James Bowman (countertenor), with Andrew Plant, Signum 2007
 Songs of Innocence (Jasper Steverlinck album), 2004
 Songs of Innocence (U2 album), 2014
 Songs of Innocence, album by Hannes Löschel
 Part 1 of Songs of Innocence and of Experience, musical setting of Blake's poems by William Bolcom

Television 
 "Songs of Innocence", the second episode of the sixth season of the TV series Pretty Little Liars

See also
Songs of Experience (disambiguation)
Songs of Innocence and of Experience (disambiguation)